Mamoun Ahmed Abdel Wahab Beheiry (October 1925 – August 2002) was a Sudanese economist, known for his contributions to African and Arab banking establishments.

Education
Following earlier education at Wad Madani primary schools, Beheiry attended Victoria College, Alexandria, and then Brasenose College, University of Oxford between 1945 and 1949 where he read for a B.A. (Hons.) in PPE Politics, Philosophy and Economics. This made him one of the first African ministers to seek an education in the west.

Career
In 1959, he became the first and founding governor of the central Bank of Sudan then went on to become the first president of the African Development Bank.

Due to his international reputation, Beheiry also became the first person to be elected Minister of Finance twice.

Legacy
Following his death in 2002, the Mamoun Beheiry Center for Economic and Social Studies and Research in Africa was established in Khartoum with the goal of promoting research in economic and social development in Africa.

References 

1925 births
2002 deaths
Sudanese bankers
Sudanese economists
Alumni of Brasenose College, Oxford